The Ostrowski Prize is a mathematics award given every odd year for outstanding mathematical achievement judged by an international jury from the universities of Basel, Jerusalem, Waterloo and the academies of Denmark and the Netherlands. Alexander Ostrowski, a longtime professor at the University of Basel, left his estate to the foundation in order to establish a prize for outstanding achievements in pure mathematics and the foundations of numerical mathematics. It currently carries a monetary award of 100,000 Swiss francs.

Recipients
 1989:	Louis de Branges    (France / United States)
 1991:	Jean Bourgain    (Belgium)
 1993:	Miklós Laczkovich (Hungary) and Marina Ratner    (Russia / United States)
 1995:	Andrew J. Wiles    (UK)
 1997: Yuri V. Nesterenko (Russia) and Gilles I. Pisier    (France)
 1999:	Alexander A. Beilinson    (Russia / United States) and Helmut H. Hofer    (Switzerland / United States)
 2001:	Henryk Iwaniec    (Poland / United States) and Peter Sarnak (South Africa / United States) and Richard L. Taylor (UK / United States)
 2003:	Paul Seymour    (UK)
 2005:	Ben Green    (UK) and Terence Tao    (Australia / United States)
 2007: Oded Schramm   (Israel / United States)
 2009: Sorin Popa   (Romania / United States) 
 2011: Ib Madsen   (Denmark), David Preiss (UK) and Kannan Soundararajan (India / United States) 
 2013: Yitang Zhang (United States) 
 2015: Peter Scholze (Germany) 
 2017: Akshay Venkatesh (India / Australia) 
 2019: Assaf Naor (Israel / USA) 
 2021:  (UK)

See also

 List of mathematics awards

References

Mathematics awards
Awards established in 1989